SADI-S (Single anastomosis duodeno–ileal bypass with sleeve gastrectomy) is a bariatric surgical technique to address metabolic disorders and to lose weight. It is a variation on the Duodenal Switch surgery, incorporating a vertical sleeve gastrectomy with a gastric bypass technique.

The SADI-S is a type of bariatric surgery with a single surgical anastomosis. It has a restrictive component when reducing the greater curvature of the stomach, but especially a malabsorptive component, as the common channel is also reduced. The objective of this surgical technique is to lessen the intestinal loop where nutrients are absorbed.

Technique
It can be performed by laparotomy or laparoscopy. A small gastric sleeve is created by sectioning the greater curvature of the stomach, such as in the sleeve technique. Subsequently, the duodenum is transected respecting the pylorus. Therefore, this distance becomes the length of the common channel where nutrients are absorbed.

Advantages
The SADI-S is a single anastomosis bariatric surgery. It is different from the classic duodenal switch, the gastric bypass (RNY) or sleeve gastrectomy. It is a type of bariatric surgery carried out to lose weight and to mitigate various metabolic issues including Type 2 Diabetes, dislipidemia, Metabolic Syndrome, and Polycystic Ovarian Syndrome.

In published studies, total weight loss and the positive impact or remission of Type 2 Diabetes was better with the SADI-S surgery than with gastric bypass or sleeve gastrectomy.

When compared to RNY surgery, the SADI preserves the stomach/pyloric valve, thus maintaining more anatomical control over release of food into the intestines, and reducing the risk or frequency of dumping syndrome.

When compared to the Duodenal Switch (DS), in addition to requiring only a single anastomosis (which reduces the incidence of leakage or stricture complication ), the SADI surgery typically leaves a longer common channel than the DS. This reduces the severity of malnutrition tied to malabsorption, and mitigates the degree of diarrhea and flatulence associated with DS.

Disadvantages
As with other bariatric malabsorptive techniques, including RNY and DS, patients will need to take vitamin supplements A, D, E, K and minerals throughout their lives. Analytical monitoring is necessary to prevent malnutrition.

Stones in the gallbladder, flatulence and diarrhea are more frequent than with the non-bariatric population.

The surgical risks are similar as in other bariatric techniques, including intestinal perforation, infection, abscess, venous thrombosis, pulmonary embolism, and andanastomotic leaks (although the single anastomosis is designed to present less risk overall compared to the multi-anastomosis techniques). In the long term, it can produce a bowel obstruction. There is a greater chance of bile reflux than a traditional duodenal switch.

While previously considered experimental, in 2020 and 2018, respectively, both the  American Society of Metabolic and Bariatric Surgery (ASMBS) and The International Federation for Surgery of Obesity and Metabolic Disorders (IFSO) released statements endorsing SADI as an effective and established surgical technique. While there is no research to indicate that it has any significant reduction in vitamin or mineral supplementation as compared to the Roux-en-Y gastric bypass surgical technique, the typically longer common channel in SADI, compared to Duodenal Switch surgery, means there is a somewhat lower degree of nutritional deficiency.

See also
 SIPS surgery

Bibliography

External links
 
 Single anastomosis duodeno-ileal bypass with sleeve gastrectomy (SADI-S). One to three-year follow-up.

Digestive system surgery
Surgical procedures and techniques
Bariatrics